Most visitors to Mozambique  unless they come from one of the visa exempt countries can obtain a visa on arrival at all border posts or from one of the Mozambican diplomatic missions.

Mozambique is part of SADC meaning that members of most other SADC countries do not require a tourist visa if visiting Mozambique for tourism purposes.

Visa policy map

Visa exemption 
Citizens of the following 14 countries can visit Mozambique without a visa for up to three months (unless otherwise noted):

Holders of diplomatic or service passports issued to nationals of Community of Portuguese Language Countries:

Angola, Brazil, Cabo Verde, Guinea-Bissau, Portugal, Sao Tome and Principe, Timor-Leste, and also nationals of Argentina, China, Cuba, India, Indonesia, Russia, Seychelles, South Korea, Turkey do not require a visa.

Visa on arrival 
Citizens of all other countries that are not visa exempt nor mentioned in the next chapter can obtain a visa on arrival at all border posts if they have documentation to prove they are traveling for leisure purposes (return ticket, accommodation confirmation or invitation letter). 

This visa is valid for 30 days and visa fee is $50.

Despite visas stating they are valid for only one entry visitors who have travelled to Eswatini and South Africa have found it was valid for two entries if still within its 30 day validity.

Maputo Airport recently began accepting credit card payments for visas.

Some visitors have been denied Visa On Arrival if their passports have not had 6 months validity.

Citizens of the following 12 countries are known to find it difficult to obtain a visa on arrival:

However, citizens of these countries may obtain a visa on arrival if and only if they hold a printed confirmation from the Immigration Authority (SENAMI) Headquarters in Maputo, indicating that a visa has been approved before departure and travel for the Rovuma Basin Project.

eVisa 
From December 2022, the Mozambique e-Visa is in operation and citizens of all countries can apply for the e-Visa.

See also

Visa requirements for Mozambican citizens
List of diplomatic missions of Mozambique

References 

Mozambique
Foreign relations of Mozambique